Louis David Harris (born 7 December 1992) is an English footballer who most recently played for Northern Premier League Premier Division  side Hednesford Town, where he plays as a midfielder.

Playing career

Wolverhampton Wanderers
Harris is a product of Wolverhampton Wanderers' academy, with whom he signed a professional contract in 2011.

Notts County (loan)
In March 2012, he moved on loan to League One side Notts County for the remainder of the season. He made his professional debut on 24 March 2012 in a goalless draw at Scunthorpe United.

AFC Wimbledon
In summer 2012, Wolves announced that his contract would not be renewed, allowing Harris to join League Two side AFC Wimbledon. Harris made 7 league appearances for AFC Wimbledon before being released by the club on 14 May 2013.

Tamworth
on 25 June 2013, it was revealed that Harris was on trial with League One side Swindon Town with hopes of earning a contract at the County Ground. The trial was unsuccessful and Harris left Swindon and joined Conference side Tamworth on trial on 9 July. On 1 August 2013, Harris joined Tamworth on a permanent basis.

Rugby Town (loan)
Louis signed for Rugby Town on a one-month loan in September 2013. He played three times before returning to Tamworth.

Barwell (loan)
Harris was straight back out on loan in October 2013, this time with Barwell, he made one league appearance.

Stourbridge
In January 2014 Harris joined Stourbridge.

Walsall Wood (dual registration)
He signed for Walsall Wood on a dual registration in November 2015.

Hednesford Town
On 3 December 2017, Harris was confirmed as signing for Hednesford Town from Romulus. Following the completion of the season, it was confirmed on 6 June 2018, that Harris had left Hednesford Town and moved to Dubai.

References

External links

1992 births
Living people
Footballers from Birmingham, West Midlands
Sportspeople from Sutton Coldfield
Association football midfielders
English footballers
Wolverhampton Wanderers F.C. players
Notts County F.C. players
AFC Wimbledon players
Tamworth F.C. players
Rugby Town F.C. players
Barwell F.C. players
Stourbridge F.C. players
Walsall Wood F.C. players
Romulus F.C. players
Hednesford Town F.C. players
English Football League players
National League (English football) players